Iwona Drąg-Korga (born July, 1967) is a Polish-American historian, archivist, educator, and the current President and Executive Director of the Józef Piłsudski Institute of America.

Biography 
Iwona Drąg-Korga has lived in New York City since 1991. She has been associated with the Józef Piłsudski Institute of America since 1995, first as a librarian and archivist, then as a deputy director, an executive director since 2005, finally becoming president of the organization in 2016.

In 1991, she graduated with a degree in history from the Pedagogical University of Cracow and a doctorate in humanities in 2004. In 2008, she obtained a master's degree in information science and library science from Queens College, City University of New York.

In 2011, she published a book titled "Poland is fighting!" which discussed the propaganda policy of the Polish government-in-exile towards American society between 1939 and 1945.

Korga serves on the board of directors at the Polish & Slavic Federal Credit Union.

Awards and honours
In 2018, she received the Officer's Cross of the Order of Merit of the Republic of Poland from the President of Poland during a special ceremony at the Presidential Palace in Warsaw. She has also been awarded the Medal of the Centennial of Regained Independence and the Medal of the National Education Commission.

References

External links 
 Józef Piłsudski Institute of America

Polish librarians
American women librarians
American librarians
Polish educators
Female archivists
Living people
Year of birth missing (living people)
American people of Polish descent
People from Greenpoint, Brooklyn
21st-century Polish non-fiction writers
21st-century Polish women writers
Queens College, City University of New York alumni